Martin Dias (born 17 October 1936) is a Guyanese weightlifter. He competed in the men's bantamweight event at the 1964 Summer Olympics.

References

1936 births
Living people
Guyanese male weightlifters
Olympic weightlifters of British Guiana
Weightlifters at the 1964 Summer Olympics
Place of birth missing (living people)
Weightlifters at the 1963 Pan American Games
Weightlifters at the 1967 Pan American Games
Commonwealth Games medallists in weightlifting
Commonwealth Games silver medallists for Guyana
Pan American Games medalists in weightlifting
Pan American Games bronze medalists for Guyana
Medalists at the 1963 Pan American Games
Medalists at the 1967 Pan American Games
Weightlifters at the 1962 British Empire and Commonwealth Games
Weightlifters at the 1966 British Empire and Commonwealth Games
20th-century Guyanese people
Medallists at the 1962 British Empire and Commonwealth Games
Medallists at the 1966 British Empire and Commonwealth Games